Pinya Chuayplod (9 April 1940 – 8 September 2022) was a Thai politician. A member of the Justice Unity Party and the Social Action Party, he served in the House of Representatives from 1979 to 1992 and the Senate from 2000 to 2006.

Chuayplod died in Bangkok on 8 September 2022, at the age of 82.

References

1940 births
2022 deaths
Pinya Chuayplod
Pinya Chuayplod
Pinya Chuayplod
Pinya Chuayplod
Pinya Chuayplod
Pinya Chuayplod
Pinya Chuayplod
Pinya Chuayplod